The 1st Brigade Combat Team, 82nd Airborne Division is an active Airborne Brigade of the United States Army.

History

Lineage and honors

Lineage
 Constituted 5 August 1917 in the National Army as Headquarters Troop, 82d Division
 Organized 25 August 1917 at Camp Gordon, Georgia
 Demobilized 27 May 1919 at Camp Mills, New York
 Reconstituted 24 June 1921 in the Organized Reserves as Headquarters Company, 82d Division
 Organized in January 1922 at Columbia, South Carolina
 Reorganized and redesignated 13 February 1942 as Headquarters and Military Police Company (less Military Police Platoon), 82d Division
 Ordered into active military service 25 March 1942 and reorganized at Camp Claiborne, Louisiana
 Reorganized and redesignated 15 August 1942 as Headquarters Company, 82d Airborne Division 
(Organized Reserves redesignated 25 March 1948 as the Organized Reserve Corps)
 Withdrawn 15 November 1948 from the Organized Reserve Corps and allotted to the Regular Army
 Reorganized and redesignated 1 September 1957 as Headquarters and Headquarters Company, Command and Control Battalion, 82d Airborne Division
 Reorganized and redesignated 25 May 1964 as Headquarters and Headquarters Company, 1st Brigade, 82d Airborne Division
 Headquarters, 1st Brigade, 82d Airborne Division, reorganized and redesignated 16 June 2006 as Headquarters, 1st Brigade Combat Team, 82d Airborne Division (Headquarters Company, 1st Brigade, 82d Airborne Division – hereafter separate lineage)

Campaign participation credit
 World War I: St. Mihiel; Meuse-Argonne; Lorraine 1918
 World War II: Sicily; Naples-Foggia; Normandy (with arrowhead); Rhineland (with arrowhead); Ardennes-Alsace; Central Europe
 Armed Forces Expeditions: Dominican Republic; Panama (with arrowhead)
 Southwest Asia: Defense of Saudi Arabia; Liberation and Defense of Kuwait
 War on Terrorism: Campaigns to be determined
 Afghanistan: Consolidation I; Transition I
 Iraq: Transition of Iraq; Iraqi Surge; Iraqi Sovereignty

 Note: The published US Army lineage lists "Campaigns to be determined" as of December 2011. Comparison of the BCT's deployment dates with War on Terrorism campaigns shows that the BCT is entitled to the 5 campaigns listed.

Decorations
 Presidential Unit Citation (Army), Streamer embroidered STE. MERE EGLISE
 Valorous Unit Award, Streamer embroidered AFGHANISTAN 2003
 Meritorious Unit Commendation (Army), Streamer embroidered SOUTHWEST ASIA 1990–1991
 Meritorious Unit Commendation (Army), Streamer embroidered IRAQ 2010
 French Croix de Guerre with Palm, World War II, Streamer embroidered STE. MERE EGLISE
 French Croix de Guerre with Palm, World War II, Streamer embroidered COTENTIN
 French Croix de Guerre, World War II, Fourragere 
 Belgian Fourragere 1940
 Cited in the Order of the Day of the Belgian Army for action in the Ardennes
 Cited in the Order of the Day of the Belgian Army for action in Belgium and Germany
 Military Order of William (Degree of the Knight of the Fourth Class), Streamer embroidered NIJMEGEN 1944
 Netherlands Orange Lanyard

See also

 Immediate Response Force

References

082 001
Airborne 082 001
Airborne 082 001
Military units and formations established in 1917